Jack E. Beauchamp (February 10, 1932–September 21, 2007) was an American politician who served for one term as a Republican member of the Kansas House of Representatives, from 1987 to 1988.

References

1932 births
2007 deaths
Republican Party members of the Kansas House of Representatives
People from Ottawa, Kansas
20th-century American politicians